The men's 5000 metres in speed skating at the 1992 Winter Olympics took place on 13 February, at the L'anneau de vitesse.

Records
Prior to this competition, the existing world and Olympic records were as follows:

Results

References

Men's speed skating at the 1992 Winter Olympics